Aristonautae or Aristonautai was a town of ancient Achaea, the harbour of Pellene, at a distance of 60 stadia from it, and 120 from Aegeira. It is said to have been so called from the Argonauts having landed there in the course of their voyage. 

Its site is located near the modern Xylokastro.

References

Populated places in ancient Achaea
Former populated places in Greece